The Pacific white skate (Bathyraja spinosissima) is a species of skate in the family Arhynchobatidae. It is one of the deepest-living of all skates, occurring at a depth of 800 to 2,938 m on the continental slope. It is native to the southeast Pacific Ocean from the Galapagos Islands to off Waldport, Oregon; an egg case and embryo has been collected from the Farallon Islands off San Francisco. Reports of it from the Sea of Okhotsk may represent a different species. Its species name, spinosissima, comes from the Latin spinosus meaning "thorny", referring to its covering of dermal denticles.

The flattened pectoral fin disc of the Pacific white skate is slightly wider than long, with broadly rounded tips. The disc is covered with numerous small denticles above and below, giving it a shagreen-like texture. Adult males possess alar spines (on the dorsal surface of the pectoral fins near the tips). The tail is slightly longer than the disc, bearing a single median row of 23-29 thorns and two similar-sized dorsal fins near the end without an interdorsal thorn. The caudal fin is long and tapering, with a filamentous fold on its upper surface. Its teeth number 34 in the upper jaw and 23 in the lower. This species is a uniform pale to salty gray above and below, with dusky outer disc margins.

The Pacific white skate feeds on benthic fishes. Like other skates they are oviparous; the egg cases are olive green in color and longitudinally striated, with horn-like projections on the shell. The size at birth is about 25 cm; the maximum known size is 1.5 m. They are of no commercial interest but are occasionally taken as by-catch.

References

Pacific white skate
Fish of the Western United States
Western North American coastal fauna
Fish of Mexican Pacific coast
Western Central American coastal fauna
Galápagos Islands coastal fauna
Fauna of California
Taxa named by William Beebe
Taxa named by John Tee-Van
Pacific white skate